Mud Lake, is a lake located in Sierra County within the U.S. state of New Mexico.

References
 

Lakes of New Mexico
Bodies of water of Sierra County, New Mexico